Walter Butler (1752 – October 30, 1781) was a British Loyalist officer during the American Revolution.  He was born near Johnstown, New York, the son of John Butler, an Indian agent who worked for Sir William Johnson.  Walter Butler studied law, and became a lawyer in Albany, New York.

Military career

At the start of the American Revolution, the women of the Butler family were taken captive in Albany while  Walter was commissioned as an Ensign in the 8th (The King's) Regiment of Foot, with which he served at the Battle of Oriskany.  When his father, John, formed Butler's Rangers, Walter Butler transferred to that company and was commissioned as a Captain.

In late 1777, he was captured by Continental Army troops while trying to recruit Rangers at Shoemaker Tavern in German Flatts, New York.  He was sentenced to death for spying by Lieutenant Colonel Marinus Willett and was imprisoned in Albany; but, after a few months, he escaped and returned to Canada.

In 1778, he and Joseph Brant, a Mohawk chief, led a company of Tories and Indians in the raid that culminated in the Cherry Valley Massacre. He has been blamed for the deaths of the many women and children who were killed on that occasion. He fought in the Battle of Johnstown and was killed on October 30, 1781, while retreating back to Canada in a skirmish with rebel troops (2nd Albany County Militia Regiment) and the Tryon County militia under Marinus Willett in the Mohawk Valley.

Cherry Valley massacre 

Captain Butler was in command of the Loyalist raiding party that attacked Cherry Valley on November 11, 1778. In a November 17, 1778 letter to his superiors in Canada, Butler blamed Joseph Brant and his Indians for the massacre of the inhabitants of Cherry Valley. Contrarily, some Americans on the Patriot side asserted that it was Butler who ordered the killing of the women and children at Cherry Valley, not Brant. The following letter from J. H. Livingston to his brother serving in the Continental Congress is presented here, in part, verbatim from the original preserved in the New York State Library in Albany, New York.

The fighting in upstate New York at times devolved into savage civil war between families and kin of whites who had lived in that region, with both sides in league with their own allies of native Amerindians. (Of the Iroquois Six Nations, the Oneida and many Tuscarora sided with the rebel forces; the Mohawk, Seneca, Onondaga and Cayuga remained loyal to Great Britain.) John Brick, a twentieth-century native of the region and a career historical novelist, researched and wrote novels from both sides of the loyalists-rebels division. In his 1954 novel "The King's Rangers"—after extensive research in Canadian archives—Brick reported that the savagery at Cherry Valley was done under direction of two sub-chiefs of Joseph Brant, the Mohawk chief; and that Brant, by dint of negligence or worse, abandoned his promise to Walter Butler to control the Indians' fighting so as to prevent attacks on women and children, the defenseless and captured.

Death 
Butler died in a skirmish on October 30, 1781. The telling of the details was of apparent great interest to his contemporaries; perhaps no other Loyalist in upstate New York was as hated as Walter Butler. Several men who were present during the event or shortly thereafter testified to the specifics in their Revolutionary War pension applications:

No word is recorded as to the disposition of Butler's body and it is doubtful that the Rebel forces did him the honor of burying him, Ross' men being actively pursued by them.

Legacy
Writer Stephen Vincent Benét listed Butler as one of the villainous jurymen, brought back from the dead to help Satan, in the 1936 short story "The Devil and Daniel Webster".

References

 
 Howard Swiggett, War Out of Niagara; Walter Butler and the Tory Rangers, Port Washington, New York 1963.
Stephen Vincent Benét, 'The Devil and Daniel Webster,' American short story

External links
Walter Butler
Shoemaker Tavern
Documents on him, in the Haldimand Collection

1752 births
1781 deaths
Loyalist military personnel of the American Revolutionary War
Loyalists in the American Revolution from New York (state)
People of the Province of New York
British military personnel killed in the American Revolutionary War